Wetteroth was a racing car constructor. Wetteroth cars competed in one FIA World Championship race - the 1950 Indianapolis 500.

Indianapolis 500 results

Notes 

Formula One constructors (Indianapolis only)
American racecar constructors